Suan Phueng is a district (amphoe) in the western part of Ratchaburi province, western Thailand.

History
Suan Phueng was the rural area of Chom Bueng district. It became a minor district (king amphoe) on 15 November 1974, consisting of the three tambons: Suan Phueng, Pa Waim, and Ban Bueng. It was upgraded to a full district on 1 April 1983.

Etymology
The name Suan Phueng (lit. 'bee garden') originates from Phueng trees (Ficus albipila) that are found in the district. In these trees bees (Thai: phueng) often build hives.

Geography
Neighboring districts are (from the north clockwise): Mueang Kanchanaburi and Dan Makham Tia of Kanchanaburi province; and Chom Bueng and Ban Kha of Ratchanburi Province. To the west is the Tanintharyi Division of Myanmar.

The important water resource is the Phachi River.

Administration
The district is divided into four sub-districts (tambons), which are further subdivided into 37 villages (mubans). There are two sub-district municipalities (thesaban tambons) within the district. Suan Phueng covers parts of tambon Suan Phueng, and Ban Chat Pa Wai covers parts of tambons Pa Wai and Tha Khoei.

The missing numbers are the tambon which now form Ban Kha minor district.

References

External links
amphoe.com

Suan Phueng